Quark was an American science magazine in the 1970s.

References

Defunct magazines published in the United States
Science and technology magazines published in the United States
Magazines with year of disestablishment missing
Magazines with year of establishment missing